is a former Japanese international table tennis player.

Table tennis career
She won a bronze medal at the 1969 World Table Tennis Championships in the women's singles.  Two years later she won another bronze at the 1971 World Table Tennis Championships in the women's doubles with Yukie Ozeki.

She won a gold medal in the women's doubles with Maria Alexandru, and another bronze in the team event at the 1973 World Table Tennis Championships.

See also
 List of table tennis players
 List of World Table Tennis Championships medalists

References

Japanese female table tennis players
World Table Tennis Championships medalists